Saurida pseudotumbil is a species of lizardfish that lives primarily off the coast of India.

Environment
S. pseudotumbil is recorded to be found in a marine environment within a demersal depth range. This species is native to a tropical climate.

Distribution
S. pseudotumbil can be found in the Indian Ocean. They can be found off the coast of India.

References

Notes
 

Synodontidae
Fish described in 1981